The 2008 Cup of Russia was the fifth event of six in the 2008–09 ISU Grand Prix of Figure Skating, a senior-level international invitational competition series. It was held at the Megasport Arena in Moscow on November 20–23. Medals were awarded in the disciplines of men's singles, ladies' singles, pair skating, and ice dancing. Skaters earned points toward qualifying for the 2008–09 Grand Prix Final. The compulsory dance was the Viennese Waltz.

Schedule
 Friday, November 21
 Compulsory dance
 Ladies' short program
 Pairs' short program
 Men's short program
 Saturday, November 22
 Ladies' free skating
 Original dance
 Pairs' free skating
 Men's free skating
 Sunday, November 23
 Free dance
 Exhibition gala

Results

Men

Ladies

Pairs

Ice dancing

External links

 2008 Cup of Russia at the International Skating Union
 
 
 
 
 

Cup Of Russia, 2008
Rostelecom Cup
Cup of Russia
2008 in Russian sport
November 2008 sports events in Europe
2008 in Moscow